is an underground metro station located in Mizuho-ku, Nagoya, Aichi Prefecture, Japan operated by the Nagoya Municipal Subway’s Sakura-dōri Line.  It is located 9.5 kilometers from the terminus of the Sakura-dōri Line at Nakamura Kuyakusho Station.

History
Sakurayama Station was opened on March 30, 1994.

Lines

 (Station number: S11)

Layout
Sakurayama Station has one underground island platform.

Platforms

External links

 Sakurayama Station official web site 
 Nagoya City University Hospital 
 Nagoya City Museum

References

Railway stations in Japan opened in 1994
Railway stations in Aichi Prefecture